Anasimus is a genus of crab in the family Inachoididae, containing two species:
Anasimus fugax A. Milne-Edwards, 1880
Anasimus latus Rathbun, 1894

References

Majoidea